Ter Doest Abbey was a Cistercian abbey in Belgium, in the present Lissewege, a district of Bruges, West Flanders.

History 

Lambert, lord of Lissewege, left an estate with a chapel in 1106 to the Benedictines, who built an abbey there. This affiliated itself to the Cistercian order in 1175 as a daughter house of Ten Duinen Abbey in Koksijde, of the filiation of Clairvaux. It had a daughter house of its own, the Abbey of Onze Lieve Vrouw Kamer, founded in 1223.

The abbey played an important part in the building of dykes and the reclamation of land in the coastal areas of Flanders, Zeeland and Holland, and also in the wool trade.

Saint Thorfinn, otherwise Thorfinn of Hamar, exiled bishop of Hamar in Norway, took refuge at Ter Doest after his opposition to King Eric II of Norway. He died in the abbey on 8 January 1285 and was buried there.

Willem van Saeftinghe, a lay brother of Ter Doest, fought with the Flemish in the Battle of the Golden Spurs in 1302, where he is said to have unhorsed the French leader, Robert, Count of Artois, whereupon other Flemish soldiers killed him. In 1308 during a revolt of the lay brothers, Willem killed the cellarer of the abbey, and injured the abbot, Willem van Cordewaegen, so badly that he nearly died.

In 1624 Ter Doest was united with Ten Duinen, which in 1627 moved to Bruges. It was dissolved in the French Revolution in 1796.

Buildings 

Almost the only building to survive is the tithe barn, 50 metres long and over 30 metres high, built in 1250.

The abbey once had a vast church with three aisles, which was destroyed in 1571 by the Calvinists. The church stood close to the abbey farm, 't Groot Ter Doest, built in 1632, which still stands,  as do an octagonal chapel of 1687 and a monumental porch of 1662.

Abbots
The list of the abbots of Ter Doest:

1174–1179: Desiderius Haket
1179–1190: Jan van Brugge
1190–1204: Mattheus van Gent
1204–1213: Willem van Oostburg
1213–1219: Daniël van Brugge
1219–1226: Salomon van Gent
1226–1230: Willem II van Tielt
1230–1237: Christiaan van Ieper
1237–1239: Willem II van Tielt
1239–1243: Hendrik van Craeywyc
1243–1256: Jan II Smedekin
1256–1274: Nicolaas Cleywaert
1274–1279: Jan III Stefaan
1279–1285: Willem III van Hemme
1285–1300: Arnulfus Neyhensis
1300–1302: Willem IV Mostaert
1302–1316: Willem V Cordewaegen
1316–1329: Nicolaas II Layenweerd
1329–1334: Hendrik II van Brabant
1334–1338: Petrus I van Axel
1338–1363: Michiel de Keysere
1363–1385: Willem IV De Smidt
1385–1417: Jan IV van Hulst
1417–1426: Thomas Vindevoet
1426–1461: Jacobus Schaep
1461–1482: Laurens De Vriendt
1482–1492: Hendrik III Keddekin
1492–1501: Martinus Weyts
1501–1506: Adriaan Lanchals
1506–1512: Jan V Vettegrave
1514- ? : Willem VII Pieters
?-1525: Josse Arents
1525–1536: Gilles van der Elst
1536–1537: Jan VI Huyssens
1537–1551: Petrus II Van den Driessche
1551–1556: Jan VII van Marissiën
1556–1559: Antonius Brakele
1559–1569: Vincent Doens

Notable monks
 Jan van He, theologian
 Johannes de Pascuis, theologian

References

Bibliography 
 Heirman/Van Santvoort, 2000: Le guide de l'architecture en Belgique (p. 90). Editions Racine: Brussels

External links 

 Châteaux Forts Médiévaux de Belgique: Grange dîmière Ter Doest 
 Photos of the barn 
 Charles Louis Carton and Ferdinand van de Putte, Chronique de l'Abbaye de Ter Doest, Bruges, Vandecasteele-Werbrouck, 1845

Christian monasteries in West Flanders
Cistercian monasteries in Belgium
Barns in Belgium
Buildings and structures in Bruges